Murray Range, is a subdivision range of the Hart Ranges, of the Northern Rockies in British Columbia, Canada.  The majority of the range lies within the Pine-Lemoray Provincial Park and is noted for its snowmobiling, hiking and ski touring opportunities.  The boundaries of the Murray Range  generally lie between the Misinchinka River to the west and Mountain Creek to the east; the Pine River to the north and Mount Reynolds to the south.

Several mountains in the range are named after local area Canadian soldiers killed in action during World War II and World War I.

Prominent Peaks

References 

Northern Interior of British Columbia
Mountain ranges of British Columbia
Ranges of the Canadian Rockies